The 11th Presidium of the Supreme People's Assembly (SPA) was elected by the 1st Session of the 11th Supreme People's Assembly on 3 September 2003. It was replaced on 9 April 2009 by the 12th SPA Presidium.

Officers

President

Vice president

Honorary Vice President

Secretary-General

Members

Add-ons

References

Citations

Bibliography
Books:
 

11th Supreme People's Assembly
Presidium of the Supreme People's Assembly
2003 establishments in North Korea
2009 disestablishments in North Korea